1 Chronicles 4 is the fourth chapter of the Books of Chronicles in the Hebrew Bible or the First Book of Chronicles in the Old Testament of the Christian Bible. The book is compiled from older sources by an unknown person or group, designated by modern scholars as "the Chronicler", and had the final shape established in late fifth or fourth century BCE. Together with chapters 2 and 3, this chapter focuses on the descendants of Judah: chapter 2 deals with the tribes of Judah in general, chapter 3 lists the sons of David in particular and chapter 4 concerns the remaining families in the tribe of Judah and the tribe of Simeon, geographically the southernmost west-Jordanian tribe. These chapters belong to the section focusing on the list of genealogies from Adam to the lists of the people returning from exile in Babylon (1 Chronicles 1:1 to 9:34).

Text
This chapter was originally written in the Hebrew language. It is divided into 43 verses.

Textual witnesses
Some early manuscripts containing the text of this chapter in Hebrew are of the Masoretic Text tradition, which includes the Aleppo Codex (10th century), and Codex Leningradensis (1008).

There is also a translation into Koine Greek known as the Septuagint, made in the last few centuries BCE. Extant ancient manuscripts of the Septuagint version include Codex Vaticanus (B; B; 4th century), and Codex Alexandrinus (A; A; 5th century).

Old Testament references
: ; ; 
:

Structure
The whole chapter belongs to an arrangement comprising 1 Chronicles 2:3–8:40 with the king-producing tribes of Judah (David;
2:3–4:43) and Benjamin (Saul; 8:1–40) bracketing the series of lists as the priestly tribe of Levi (6:1–81) anchors the center, in the following order:
A David’s royal tribe of Judah (2:3–4:43)
B Northern tribes east of Jordan (5:1–26)
X The priestly tribe of Levi (6:1–81)
B' Northern tribes west of Jordan (7:1–40)
A' Saul’s royal tribe of Benjamin (8:1–40)

Another concentric arrangement focuses on David's royal tribe of Judah (2:3–4:23), centering on the family of Hezron, Judah's grandson, through his three sons: Jerahmeel, Ram, and Chelubai (Caleb), as follows:

A Descendants of Judah: Er, Onan, and Shelah (2:3–8)
B Descendants of Ram up to David (2:9–17)
C Descendants of Caleb (2:18–24)
D Descendants of Jerahmeel (2:25–33)
D' Descendants of Jerahmeel (2:34–41)
C' Descendants of Caleb (2:42–55)
B' Descendants of Ram following David [David’s descendants] (3:1–24)
A' Descendants of Shelah, Judah s only surviving son (4:21–23)

Descendants of Judah (4:1–8)
This section, continued in verses 11–23, consists of 'many small, seemingly unrelated pieces' with little textual clarity, which potentially could be a valuable historical source, although it is difficult to interpret. These lists partly refer back to chapter 2. A number of prominent women are listed here (as well as in the latter parts): 
 Hazzelelponi, daughter of Etam
 Ephrathah, mother of Hur and grandmother of Bethlehem
 Helah and Naarah, the two wives of Asshur (verse 5)
 Unnamed mother of Jabez (verse 9)

Verse 2
And Reaiah the son of Shobal begat Jahath; and Jahath begat Ahumai, and Lahad. These are the families of the Zorathites.
"Reaiah": written as "Haroeh" in 

Prayer of Jabez (4:9–10)

These two verses form a unique passage highlighting the Chronicler's respect for wealth and the effectiveness of prayer. It shows one example of the Chronicler's frequent use of meaningful names: "Jabez" was given that name because his mother bore him with sorrow (meaning "in pain"; verse 9), while he himself prays that no sorrow' (verse 10) would fall upon him.

More descendants of Judah (4:11–23)
Together with verses 1–8, this section partly refers back to chapter 2. Some prominent women are listed here (other than in the previous parts): 
 Bithiah: "daughter of Pharaoh, whom Mered married" (verse 18)
 Miriam, a daughter (verse 17)
 Mered's unnamed Judahite wife (or the name is "Jehudijah" according to KJV  and NKJV; verse 18) 
 The wife of Hodiah, the sister of Naham (verse 19)

Descendants of Simeon (4:24–43)

Verse 31
Beth Marcaboth, Hazar Susim, Beth Biri, and at Shaaraim. These were their cities until the reign of David.
"Until the reign of David": or "until David became king", an emphasis by the Chronicler that the engulfing of the tribe of Simeon by Judah happened during David's reign (if not before).

See also

Related Bible parts: 1 Chronicles 2, 2 Chronicles 30, Matthew 6

Notes

References

Sources

External links
 Jewish translations:
 Divrei Hayamim I - I Chronicles - Chapter 4 (Judaica Press) translation [with Rashi's commentary] at Chabad.org
 Christian translations:
 Online Bible at GospelHall.org (ESV, KJV, Darby, American Standard Version, Bible in Basic English)
 First Book of Chronicles Chapter 4. Bible Gateway

04